I Wanna may refer to:
"I Wanna" (The All-American Rejects song) (2009)
"I Wanna" (Bob Sinclar song) (2010)
"I Wanna" (Marie N song), winner of the 2002 Eurovision Song Contest representing Latvia
"I Wanna", a 1995 song by Montell Jordan from This Is How We Do It